Badcock Home Furniture & more is a chain of over 370 company and dealer owned furniture stores in eight states across the southeastern United States. Robert B. Burnette is president of Badcock Home Furniture and previously served as chief operating officer for the company.

History 
The first store was opened by Henry S. Badcock in Mulberry, Florida in 1904.

Badcock was recognized as a centennial retailer by Florida governor Jeb Bush in 2004. In 2005, Badcock was listed by Furniture Today magazine in the top 25 furniture retailers by sales.

References

Furniture retailers of the United States
Companies based in Polk County, Florida
Economy of the Southeastern United States
Mulberry, Florida
Retail companies based in Florida
Retail companies established in 1904
American companies established in 1904
1904 establishments in Florida